Brian Sheehan (born 1972) is an Irish retired hurler who played as a left corner-back for the Cork senior team.

Born in Blarney, County Cork, Sheehan first arrived on the inter-county scene at the age of seventeen when he first linked up with the Cork minor teams as a dual player, before later joining the under-21, junior and intermediate sides. He joined the senior team during the 1992 championship. Sheehan went on to be a regular member of the team for a number of years, winning one Munster medal as an unused substitute.

At club level Sheehan is a one-time championship medallist in the junior grade with Blarney.

Honours

Team

Blarney
Cork Junior Hurling Championship (1): 1993

Cork
Munster Senior Hurling Championship (1): 1992
All-Ireland Junior Hurling Championship (1): 1994 (sub)
Munster Junior Hurling Championship (3): 1992, 1994, 1996
Munster Under-21 Hurling Championship (2): 1991, 1993
Munster Minor Hurling Championship (1): 1988

References

1972 births
Living people
Blarney hurlers
Cork inter-county hurlers
Cork inter-county Gaelic footballers